Monsanima is a genus of flowering plants belonging to the family Apocynaceae.

Its native range is Eastern Brazil.

Species:

Monsanima morrenioides 
Monsanima tinguaensis

References

Apocynaceae
Apocynaceae genera